Memphis 901 FC is an American professional soccer team based in Memphis, Tennessee. Founded in 2018, the team made its debut in the USL Championship in 2019.

Stadium 
The club currently plays on the grounds of AutoZone Park, a baseball stadium which is also home of the Memphis Redbirds of the Pacific Coast League. The club also played at Mike Rose Soccer Complex for a U.S. Open Cup game against Hartford Athletic on May 29, 2019, and for a U.S. Open Cup game against Orlando City SC on June 12, 2019.

On October 18, 2022, the club announced plans for a new soccer-specific stadium with a capacity of 10,000. The stadium is planned to open in time for the 2025 USL Championship season and will be constructed at the current site of the Mid-South Coliseum, which closed in 2006.

Ownership
The club is owned by Peter Freund, principal owner of Trinity Sports Holdings, Craig Unger, and former United States men's national soccer team goalkeeper Tim Howard. Trinity Sports Holdings' portfolio includes minor league baseball clubs Memphis Redbirds, the Charleston RiverDogs and the Williamsport Crosscutters. Unger also serves as president, general manager, and part owner of the Redbirds. The consortium also purchased a majority holding in English fifth-tier association football club, Dagenham & Redbridge F.C.

Club culture

Rivalries
Memphis competes in the Southern Harm derby against rivals Birmingham Legion.

Supporter's Groups 
Memphis 901 are supported by the Bluff City Mafia. Founded in August, 2018 before Memphis' inaugural season by Russell and Clayton France, they are known for their march from a local Irish pub the Brass Door to AutoZone Park prior to every home game.

Prior to every home game, the Bluff City Mafia invites local celebrities and officials to take part in what has become known as the Guitar Smash, an homage to Memphis' musical roots.

Sponsorship

Players and staff

Roster

Staff

Team records

Year-by-year

1. Top scorer includes statistics from league matches only.

Head coaches
 Includes USL-C regular season, USL-C playoffs, U.S. Open Cup. Excludes friendlies.

Average attendance

 Attendance records taken from USL Championship match reports and collated by Soccer Stadium Digest, 2022.

References

External links

 

 
USL Championship teams
2018 establishments in Tennessee
9
Association football clubs established in 2018
Soccer clubs in Tennessee